Sutherland is a census-designated place in northeastern Millard County, Utah, United States. The population was 165 at the 2010 census.

Geography
Sutherland is one of a number of small farming communities in the area, including Woodrow and Sugarville just to the north. About  to the west is the site of the historic Topaz War Relocation Center.

History
In 1909, a tract of thousands of acres of land northwest of the new city of Delta became available for agricultural settlement, under the terms of the Carey Act. Settlers began to cluster around the property of Myron Abbott, regarded as founder of the community, which was known early on as North Tract or West Delta. By 1912, there were 80 families with 121 children of school age in the area. Tired of waiting for county officials, private citizens built a public schoolhouse in 1913. Then residents petitioned for the creation of a voting precinct and school district. The name Sutherland was chosen in honor of 
Utah political figure George Sutherland, who was serving as a United States senator at the time. The Sutherland elementary school remained open until the 1970s.

Demographics

As of the census of 2010, there were 165 people living in the CDP. There were 53 housing units. The racial makeup was 95.8% White, 3.0% from some other race, and 1.2% from two or more races. Hispanic or Latino of any race were 6.1% of the population.

Notable person
 Carlos E. Asay—Member of the First Quorum of the Seventy of the LDS Church, born in Sutherland

See also

 List of census-designated places in Utah

References

External links

Census-designated places in Utah
Populated places established in 1909
Census-designated places in Millard County, Utah
1909 establishments in Utah
Great Basin National Heritage Area